The 1967 Tasman Series was a motor racing competition open to racing cars complying with the Tasman Formula. Officially known as the Tasman Championship for Drivers, it was organised by the Motorsport Association, New Zealand Inc. and the Confederation of Australian Motor Sport and was contested over six races in New Zealand and Australia between 7 January and 6 March 1967.

The series, which was the fourth annual Tasman Series, was won by Jim Clark driving a Lotus 33.

Races

The series was contested over six races with two additional races at Levin and Teretonga not counting for points.

Points system
Points were awarded at each race as shown in the following table:

All points scored were counted.

Series standings

References

Further reading
 1967, The Official 50-race history of the Australian Grand Prix, 1986, pages 320-326
 In The Mirrors, Australian Motor Racing Annual, 1967, pages 6-13 & 57-62
 Jim Shepherd, A History of Australian Motor Racing, 1980, pages 40-41

External links
 1967 Season, www.sergent.com.au

1967
Tasman Series
Tasman Series